The Society for Pediatric Research (SPR) is an international society of multidisciplinary pediatric researchers.  The Society works with four independent regional societies: Eastern, Midwestern, Southern, and Western Societies for Pediatric Research. The Society for Pediatric Research is a collaborative partner with the American Pediatric Society.

See also
American Academy of Pediatrics
American College of Pediatricians
Academic Pediatric Association
American Pediatric Society

References

International medical associations
Pediatric organizations
Medical research organizations
International professional associations